Tamás Tóth (born 29 November 1965) is a Hungarian sports shooter. He competed in the men's 10 metre air pistol event at the 1988 Summer Olympics.

References

External links
 
 
 
 

1965 births
Living people
Hungarian male sport shooters
Olympic shooters of Hungary
Shooters at the 1988 Summer Olympics
Sportspeople from Debrecen